Seamus "Shay" Keogh (6 September 1934 – 13 April 2020) was an Irish footballer who played as a centre half. He was part of the great Shamrock Rovers teams of the 1950s in a side, popularly known as Coad's Colts, that enjoyed many memorable days during that decade. A former schoolboy and youth international, he joined Shamrock Rovers in 1952 and stayed for nearly a decade at Glenmalure Park. As a Crumlin man, Shay played in the club's first four European games against Manchester United and OGC Nice in the European Champion Club's Cup.

Career
He captained his country in the first ever B international in October 1957. He won his second "B" cap the following year winning in Iceland.

He won one cap for the Republic of Ireland in a 2–2 friendly against Poland at Dalymount Park on 5 October 1958.

Shay represented the League of Ireland XI nine times between 1955 and 1959.

He shared a benefit game with Ronnie Nolan in May 1961.

In September 1961 he signed for Dundalk F.C. and also had further spells at Jacobs F.C. and as player-manager at St Patrick's Athletic F.C. between 1963 and 1965.

On 20 December 1973, Liam Tuohy resigned as Rovers manager. Shay, who was at that time the technical advisor to the club, was appointed manager, with Dougie Wood but resigned two days later.

Personal life
Keogh died in the Rathfarnham suburb of Dublin on 13 April 2020 at the age of 86.

Honours
 League of Ireland: 3

 Shamrock Rovers – 1953/54, 1956/57, 1958/59
 FAI Cup: 2

 Shamrock Rovers – 1955, 1956
 League of Ireland Shield: 3

 Shamrock Rovers – 1955/56, 1956/57, 1957/58
Leinster Senior Cup: 5
  Shamrock Rovers – 1953, 1955, 1956, 1957, 1958
Dublin City Cup: 5
  Shamrock Rovers – 1952/53, 1954/55, 1956/57, 1957/58, 1959/60
Top Four Cup: 2
  Shamrock Rovers – 1956, 1958

References

General references
 The Hoops by Paul Doolan and Robert Goggins

1934 births
2020 deaths
Association footballers from County Dublin
Republic of Ireland association footballers
Republic of Ireland international footballers
Republic of Ireland B international footballers
Shamrock Rovers F.C. players
St Patrick's Athletic F.C. players
Dundalk F.C. players
League of Ireland players
League of Ireland managers
Shamrock Rovers F.C. managers
St Patrick's Athletic F.C. managers
Sligo Rovers F.C. managers
League of Ireland XI players
Association football central defenders
Republic of Ireland football managers